Sir Ignazio Gavino Bonavito GCMG (1792  1865) was the chief justice of Malta from 1839 to 1853.

Selected publications
 Raccolta delle leggi di procedura delle Corti superiori Ordinarie di Malta pubblicate dal 1814 al 1840 come sono attualmente in vigore (1841)
 Saggio sulla prova giudiziaria considerata in rapporto all'attuale legislazione maltese (1844, revised second edn. 1849)

References 

1792 births
1865 deaths
Maltese knights
19th-century Maltese judges